Brendan Clarke (born 17 September 1985 in Dublin) is an Irish football player who plays for Galway United in the League of Ireland First Division.

Club career

St Patrick's Athletic
Clarke is a goalkeeper and played schoolboy football for local side Cherry Orchard.  He is one of a handful of local players to have played for St. Pats. Clarke had an extended spell in the first team at the end of the 2004 season as regular 'keeper Chris Adamson's form dropped.

In 2007, Clarke was sent on a season-long loan to Waterford United but was recalled before the season got underway. At the end of the 2007 season, Clarke played in the 4 of the last 5 league games. Keeping 3 clean sheets out of 4 ensuring the Saints secured UEFA Cup football in 2008. He only missed the last game of the season due to an injury during the warm-up.

He had a very successful loan spell at Sporting Fingal F.C. during the 2nd half of the 2008 season. He played 14 games for Fingal, keeping 7 clean sheets.

When coming back to the Saints for the 2009 season, Clarke was told by the then boss, John McDonnell, that he'd be his number 1 goalkeeper for the season. McDonnell then left the club and was replaced by Jeff Kenna as manager. Kenna let goalkeeper Barry Ryan go to Galway United and replaced him with Galway keeper Gary Rogers. Kenna favoured Rogers from day one and installed Rogers as his number 1 keeper. When Jeff Kenna resigned, new manager Pete Mahon came in and immediately put Clarke into the team. Clarke played in the final 10 games of the 2009 season and put in some fine performances. He kept 4 clean sheets in the 10 games including clean sheets against the Saints relegation rivals Bray Wanderers twice and Dundalk, and also keeping a clean sheet in the vital last game of the season against Shamrock Rovers.

Sporting Fingal
Following the 2009 season, Clarke signed a 2-year full-time contract with Sporting Fingal, where he'd had a very successful loan spell in 2008.

Sligo Rovers
After Sporting Fingal ceased trading Clarke's contract was cancelled and he signed for Sligo Rovers on a 1-year full-time contract on 15 February 2011. Clarke impressed immediately by saving a penalty on his debut in the 1–0 win over Derry City F.C. in The Brandywell. He followed this up by keeping 5 clean sheets in his first 6 games. He has gone on a great run and has currently kept 9 consecutive clean sheets, setting a new League of Ireland record for consecutive clean sheets. This has helped Rovers move to the top of the Airtricity League Premier Division. Solid performances from Clarke helped Sligo to a 2nd-place finish in the league and also a cup winners medal as Sligo lifted the FAI Cup for the second year in a row.

Return to St Patrick's Athletic
Clarke signed a contract to return to the Saints for the 2012 season on 21 December 2011. He earned his place as number one keeper ahead of Barry Murphy and kept five clean sheets in the opening eight games of the season, conceding only three goals. Clarke remained at the Saints for five seasons, in which he won the League in 2013, the 2014 President's Cup, the 2014 Leinster Senior Cup, the 2014 FAI Cup (the club's first in 53 years), as well as the League Cup in 2015 and 2016.

Limerick
On 3 December 2016, Limerick announced via their Twitter account that they had signed Clarke on a 2-year contract ahead of the 2017 season. He made a total of 54 appearances in all competitions with the club, winning the supporters player of the year award for 2017, before departing in the summer of 2018 due to financial difficulties at the club.

Third Spell at St Patrick's Athletic
He returned to St Patrick's Athletic for a third spell at the club, midway through their 2018 season. On 18 September 2018, he scored the first goal of his career, scoring the winner in a 2–1 win over Sligo Rovers from the penalty spot. In November 2018 he signed a new 2-year contract with the club. Despite being named the clubs Player of the Year by fans for the 2019 season, head of the 2020 season Clarke was told by manager Stephen O'Donnell that he could leave the club, however he decided to stay and fight for the starting spot with Conor Kearns and Brian Maher. By the end of the season Clarke had played every minute of every league game for the club and was voted Player of the Year for the second year running.

Shelbourne
He joined Shelbourne in November 2020 ahead of their 2021 League of Ireland First Division season.

Galway United
On 26 November 2022, it was announced that Clarke would be joining Galway United for their 2023 campaign.

International career
He has represented the Republic of Ireland at schools international level and was selected as part of the Republic of Ireland Under 23 squad to play Northern Ireland in 2008.

Personal life
In April 2020, Clarke opened up about having previously used the mental health services made available to players via the PFAI and urged other players to avail of the services also should they need them. Clarke was named as Chairperson of the PFAI in September 2020, taking over from outgoing Chairperson & former teammate Gary Rogers, with Roberto Lopes as his vice-chairperson.

Career statistics 
Professional appearances – correct as of 26 November 2022.

Honours

Club
St Patrick's Athletic
League of Ireland Premier Division (1): 2013
FAI Cup (1): 2014
League of Ireland Cup (3): 2003, 2015, 2016
President's Cup (1): 2014
Leinster Senior Cup (2): 2014, 2019

Sligo Rovers
FAI Cup (1): 2011

Shelbourne
League of Ireland First Division (1): 2021

Maynooth University (As assistant manager)
Collingwood Cup (1): 2014

Personal
League of Ireland consecutive clean sheet record: 9 in 2011 with Sligo Rovers
PFAI Team of the Year (1): 2013
PFAI Team of the Year First Division (1): 2021
SWAI Goalkeeper of the Year (1): 2013
Limerick Supporters Club Player of the Year: 2017
St Patrick's Athletic Player of the Year (2): 2019, 2020

References

External links

1985 births
Living people
Republic of Ireland association footballers
St Patrick's Athletic F.C. players
League of Ireland players
Sporting Fingal F.C. players
Sligo Rovers F.C. players
Limerick F.C. players
Shelbourne F.C. players
Galway United F.C. players
Cherry Orchard F.C. players
Association football goalkeepers
Association footballers from County Dublin